William Douglas Gordon (January 4, 1918 – August 12, 1991) was an American actor, writer, director, story editor, and producer. Although he is best known for his writing credits, he acted occasionally on numerous TV series.

Biography
Gordon was born in Santa Clara, California in 1918. He started his career as a writer in 1936, writing for radio shows like The Cisco Kid, The Count of Monte Cristo and The Tommy Dorsey Show.  In 1939, he began to direct TV shows, directing the first live television shows for the Don Lee Network and later he served as an infantry officer during World War II. In 1958, he acted for the first time in Maverick, appearing subsequently in TV series including Maverick, The Twilight Zone, Thriller, Peter Gunn, Law of the Plainsman, Riverboat, Rawhide, The Americans and The Virginian during the 1960s. He also worked as a script writer for shows like Alfred Hitchcock Presents, The Fugitive, Bonanza, Ironside and Barbary Coast, in addition to writing the screenplay of the films Cotter and Sergeant Ryker.

As a director, he directed one episode of The Richard Boone Show titled "Death Before Dishonor" and another of The Fugitive titled "A.P.B.". On March 31, 1965, he became the producer of Twelve O'Clock High, producing 47 episodes of the series, in addition to producing 32 episodes of The Fugitive between 1964 and 1966. He worked as a story supervisor of The Richard Boone Show, Bonanza, Thriller and Alfred Hitchcock Presents and directed the television game show Queen for a Day. From 1977 to 1982, Gordon, along with James Doherty, helped to produce, write and edit the TV series CHiPs. After retirement, Gordon began writing novels about the Civil War.

Death
Gordon died in Thousand Oaks, California of lung cancer aged 73.

Selected filmography

Actor
 Cimarron City - The Blood Line (1958) TV Episode .... Roy Rankin
 Maverick - Escape to Tampico (1958) TV Episode .... Sam Garth - Prey of the Cat (1958) TV Episode .... Fred Bender - Two Tickets to Ten Strike (1959) TV Episode .... Eddie Burke
 Peter Gunn - The Portrait (1959) TV Episode .... Maddox
 Law of the Plainsman - Prairie Incident (1959) TV Episode .... Deke - A Matter of Life and Death (1959) TV Episode .... Henchman
 Riverboat - Payment in Full (1959) TV Episode .... Joe Travis - The Barrier (1959) TV Episode  .... Joe Travis - About Roger Mowbray (1959) TV Episode .... Joe Travis - A Race to Cincinnati (1959) TV Episode .... Joe Travis - The Unwilling (1959) TV Episode .... Joe Travis - The Fight Back (1959) TV Episode .... Joe Travis - Escape to Memphis (1959) TV Episode .... Joe Travis - Witness No Evil (1959) TV Episode .... Joe Travis - A Night at Trapper's Landing (1959) TV Episode .... Joe Travis - The Faithless (1959) TV Episode .... Joe Travis - The Boy from Pittsburgh (1959) TV Episode .... Joe Travis - Strange Request (1959) TV Episode .... Joe Travis - Guns for Empire (1959) TV Episode .... Joe Travis - The Face of Courage (1959) TV Episode .... Joe Travis
 Black Saddle - A Case of Slow (1960) TV Episode .... Dr. Tom Wall
 Rawhide - Incident of the Last Chance (1960) TV Episode .... Sid Gorman
 The Twilight Zone - Nervous Man in a Four Dollar Room .... George - Eye of the Beholder .... Doctor
 The Americans - Harper's Ferry (1961) TV Episode .... Lt. Barnes - The Regular (1961) TV Episode .... Lt. Barnes
 Thriller - The Premature Burial (1961) TV Episode .... Doctor March
 Laramie - The Star Trail (1959) TV Episode .... Vic Stoddard - A Grave for Cully Brown (1962) TV Episode .... Giles
 The Virginian - West (1962) TV Episode .... Blench
 Bearcats! - Powderkeg (1971) TV Episode .... Fallon, Hotel Goon
 The Bold Ones: The Lawyers - The Strange Secret of Yermo Hill (1971) TV Episode .... Dr. Sinclair 
 Alias Smith and Jones - What happened at the XST? (1972) TV Episode .... Reverend Siever
 Captains and the Kings - Chapter III (1976) TV Episode .... Doctor Gill
 Hunter - Blow-Up (1986) TV Episode .... Minister

Writer
 Startime (1960) TV Series (writer - 1 episode)
 The Americans (1961) TV Series (writer - 2 episodes) (teleplay - 1 episode)
 Thriller (1961-1962) TV Series (adaptation - 2 episodes)
 Outlaws (1961-1962) TV Series (writer - 3 episodes)
 Rodeo (1963) TV Series (writer - 1 episode)
 Alfred Hitchcock Presents (1962-1964) TV Series (teleplay - 6 episodes)
 Kraft Suspense Theatre (1963-1964) TV Series (writer - 1 episode) (teleplay - 4 episodes)
 The Richard Boone Show (1963-1964) TV Series (teleplay - 4 episodes) (writer - 1 episode) (written by - 1 episode)
 Breaking Point (1964) TV Series (written by - 1 episode)
 The Fugitive (1963-1965) TV Series (written by- 3 episodes) (teleplay - 2 episodes)
 12 O'Clock High (1965-1966) TV Series (writer - 3 episodes)
 Sergeant Ryker (1968) (screenplay)
 The Name of the Game (1969-1970)  TV Series (written by - 2 episodes)
 The Bold Ones: The Lawyers (1970-1971) TV Series (teleplay - 2 episodes)
 Alias Smith and Jones (1971-1972) TV Series (writer - 1 episode) (teleplay - 1 episode)
 Bonanza (1972) TV Series (writer - 1 episode)
 Cotter (1973) (writer)
 Petrocelli (1974) TV Series (written by - 1 episode)
 The Six Million Dollar Man (1975) TV Series (story - 1 episode)
 Ironside (1973-1975) TV Series (teleplay - 5 episodes) (written by - 5 episodes) (story - 3 episodes)
 Barbary Coast (1975-1976) TV Series (writer - 1 episode) (written by - 1 episode)
 Chips (1978-1981) TV Series (writer - 4 episodes) (teleplay - 2 episodes) (teleplay & story - 1 episode) (story - 1 episode)

Producer
 Twelve O'Clock High (1965–1967) TV Series (producer – 47 episodes)
 The Fugitive (1964–1966) TV Series (associate producer – 32 episodes)

Miscellaneous crew
 The Richard Boone Show (1963-1964) TV Series (story supervisor – 17 episodes)
 Bonanza (1972) TV Series (executive story consultant – 3 episodes)
 Barbary Coast (1975–1976) TV Series (story editor – 11 episodes)
 CHiPs (1978-1982) TV Series (story editor – 77 episodes) (story supervisor – 2 episodes)

References

External links
 
 

1918 births
1991 deaths
Deaths from lung cancer in California
20th-century American male actors
American male television actors
Male actors from California
American television producers
American television directors
American television writers
American radio writers
American male television writers
20th-century American screenwriters
20th-century American male writers